Alemannischer Literaturpreis is a German literary prize. It was established in 1981 and is awarded to authors in the Alemannic regions of Germany. The prize was originally awarded every two years but changed to every three years in 1987. The winner is awarded €10,000.

Winners 

 1981: Ernst Burren
 1983: Maria Beig
 1985: Manfred Bosch
 1987: Franz Hohler
 1990: Markus Werner
 1993: Robert Schneider
 1996: Hermann Kinder
 1999: Arnold Stadler
 2002: Martin Walser
 2005: Karl-Heinz Ott
 2008: 
 2011: Peter Stamm
 2014: Thomas Hürlimann
 2017:	Arno Geiger
 2020: Christoph Keller

References

External links
 

German literary awards
Awards established in 1981
1981 establishments in Germany